Ernest Mateen (June 3, 1966 – November 6, 2012, in Bedford-Stuyvesant, Brooklyn, New York), nicknamed 'M-16', was a United States and IBU Cruiserweight (boxing) champion. He was shot to death by his wife in a case of probable self-defense.

Amateur career
As an amateur boxer in New York City, M-16 Mateen won two New York Golden Gloves Championships. Mateen won the 1988 and 1989 178 pound Open Championships. In 1988, Mateen defeated Clinton Mitchell of the Police Athletic League in the finals to win the Championship. Mitchell then turned pro and defeated Bernard Hopkins on December 11, 1988, in their professional debuts. M-16 Mateen remained an amateur, and in 1989 repeated as 178 pound Open Champion again by defeating Jade Scott of the Police Athletic League in the New York Golden Gloves championship final. Mateen trained at the Bedford-Stuyvesant, Brooklyn BA in 1988 and at Gleason's Gym in 1989. He was trained in the amateurs by his father, Ernest Mateen Sr., an auto mechanic and a father of nine, who was shot and killed in mid-afternoon in a crowded open-air vegetable market in Canarsie, Brooklyn in May 1990.

Professional career
M-16 Mateen turned pro in the Light heavyweight boxing division on January 13, 1991, and won by decision over undefeated David Telesco, who went on to become the USBA Light heavyweight champion ranked # 1 by the WBC, WBA and IBF. Mateen drew with, then later defeated Tim Wilson, and won by decision over David Telesco again. M-16 Mateen went undefeated in his first twenty professional bouts, including wins over 12-0 Steve Pannell and 20-0 Billy Lewis. M-16 Mateen also defeated Kevin Watts, Dale Jackson, and Drake Thadzi (who later defeated James Toney), fighters with a combined 65 wins, en route to winning the Nevada State and World Boxing Council Continental Americas Light heavyweight boxing title and rising as high as # 2 in the world ratings, before losing his title in the tenth round to Charles Williams (boxer). Williams had fought in 11 consecutive IBF Light heavyweight world title fights before fighting Mateen. In a controversial ending, M-16 Mateen was later disqualified in the fifth round of a Light heavyweight world title bout against champion James Toney.

M-16 Mateen went on to decision John Scully twice, later known as the trainer of Chad Dawson, and drew with future Cruiserweight (boxing) champion O'Neil Bell. M-16 went on to win the United States Boxing Organization Cruiserweight title by 12-round decision over Joey DeGrandis. M-16 Mateen went on to win the International Boxing Union version of the Cruiserweight (boxing) title, stopping Uriah Grant twice in title bouts. Grant went on to stop Thomas Hearns.

M-16 Mateen finished with a professional record 30-12-3 with 10 knockouts. In his last two fights, M-16 Mateen lost to future top contender Matt Godfrey, but finished his career with a ten-round unanimous decision over veteran Terry Porter in Memphis, Tennessee, on June 10, 2006, leaving the ring a winner at age 40.

Professional boxing record

|-
|align="center" colspan=8|30 Wins (10 knockouts, 20 decisions), 12 Losses (10 knockouts, 2 decisions), 3 Draws 
|-
| align="center" style="border-style: none none solid solid; background: #e3e3e3"|Result
| align="center" style="border-style: none none solid solid; background: #e3e3e3"|Record
| align="center" style="border-style: none none solid solid; background: #e3e3e3"|Opponent
| align="center" style="border-style: none none solid solid; background: #e3e3e3"|Type
| align="center" style="border-style: none none solid solid; background: #e3e3e3"|Round
| align="center" style="border-style: none none solid solid; background: #e3e3e3"|Date
| align="center" style="border-style: none none solid solid; background: #e3e3e3"|Location
| align="center" style="border-style: none none solid solid; background: #e3e3e3"|Notes
|-align=center
|Win
|align=left|
|align=left| Terry Porter
|UD
|10
|10/06/2006
|align=left| Memphis, Tennessee, U.S.
|align=left|
|-
|Loss
|
|align=left| Matt Godfrey
|TKO
|2
|13/02/2006
|align=left| Dunkin Donuts Center, Providence, Rhode Island, U.S.
|align=left|
|-
|Win
|
|align=left| Ronnie Smith
|UD
|6
|21/01/2006
|align=left| Olive Branch, Mississippi, U.S.
|align=left|
|-
|Win
|
|align=left| Uriah Grant
|TKO
|8
|15/11/2003
|align=left| Boynton Beach, Florida, U.S.
|align=left|
|-
|Loss
|
|align=left| Vassiliy Jirov
|TKO
|7
|07/08/2003
|align=left| Pechanga Resort and Casino, Temecula, California, U.S.
|align=left|
|-
|Loss
|
|align=left| Rich LaMontagne
|TKO
|6
|02/05/2003
|align=left| Foxwoods Resort Casino, Mashantucket, Connecticut, U.S.
|align=left|
|-
|Win
|
|align=left| Uriah Grant
|TD
|9
|09/11/2002
|align=left| South Florida Fairgrounds Expo Center, West Palm Beach, Florida, U.S.
|align=left|
|-
|Win
|
|align=left| Joey DeGrandis
|UD
|12
|27/09/2002
|align=left| Ramada, Rosemont, Illinois, U.S.
|align=left|
|-
|align=center style="background:#abcdef;"|Draw
|
|align=left| O'Neil Bell
|TD
|3
|26/04/2002
|align=left| Ramada, Rosemont, Illinois, U.S.
|align=left|
|-
|Win
|
|align=left| Iceman John Scully
|UD
|8
|19/04/2001
|align=left| New Haven Coliseum, New Haven, Connecticut, U.S.
|align=left|
|-
|Loss
|
|align=left| Antonio Tarver
|KO
|1
|29/02/2000
|align=left| Plaza Hotel & Casino, Las Vegas, Nevada, U.S.
|align=left|
|-
|Loss
|
|align=left| Will Taylor
|TKO
|6
|07/11/1997
|align=left| First Union Center, Philadelphia, Pennsylvania, U.S.
|align=left|
|-
|align=center style="background:#abcdef;"|Draw
|
|align=left| Chris Johnson
|TD
|3
|03/10/1997
|align=left| Tropicana Hotel & Casino, Atlantic City, New Jersey, U.S.
|align=left|
|-
|Win
|
|align=left| Iceman John Scully
|UD
|10
|29/06/1997
|align=left| Dressler Arena, Hartford, Connecticut, U.S.
|align=left|
|-
|Loss
|
|align=left| David Telesco
|TKO
|8
|11/04/1997
|align=left| Capitol Theater, Port Chester, New York, U.S.
|align=left|
|-
|Loss
|
|align=left| Imamu Mayfield
|TKO
|4
|03/05/1996
|align=left| Somerset, New Jersey, U.S.
|align=left|
|-
|Loss
|
|align=left| James Toney
|DQ
|5
|09/09/1995
|align=left| Caesars Palace, Paradise, Nevada, U.S.
|align=left|
|-
|Loss
|
|align=left| Tim Hillie
|PTS
|10
|29/04/1995
|align=left| US Air Arena, Landover, Maryland, U.S.
|align=left|
|-
|Loss
|
|align=left| Garry Delaney
|TKO
|7
|18/03/1995
|align=left| Green Glens Arena, Millstreet, Ireland
|align=left|
|-
|Win
|
|align=left| Ron Preston
|PTS
|10
|18/11/1994
|align=left| Webster, Massachusetts, U.S.
|align=left|
|-
|Win
|
|align=left| Luis Oliveira
|TKO
|1
|30/09/1994
|align=left| Worcester, Massachusetts, U.S.
|align=left|
|-
|Loss
|
|align=left| Rudy Nix
|TKO
|2
|30/06/1994
|align=left| Trump Castle, Atlantic City, New Jersey, U.S.
|align=left|
|-
|Loss
|
|align=left| Charles Williams
|TKO
|10
|07/04/1994
|align=left| Robinsonville, Mississippi, U.S.
|align=left|
|-
|Win
|
|align=left| Robert Thomas
|PTS
|10
|21/01/1994
|align=left| Hotel Pennsylvania, New York City, New York, U.S.
|align=left|
|-
|Win
|
|align=left| John McClain
|UD
|10
|09/12/1993
|align=left| Paramount Theatre, New York City, New York, U.S.
|align=left|
|-
|Win
|
|align=left| Billy Lewis
|TKO
|10
|06/10/1993
|align=left| Harrah's Atlantic City, Atlantic City, New Jersey, U.S.
|align=left|
|-
|Win
|
|align=left| Tim St Clair
|UD
|10
|30/07/1993
|align=left| Ramada, New York City, New York, U.S.
|align=left|
|-
|Win
|
|align=left| Drake Thadzi
|MD
|10
|13/05/1993
|align=left| Atlantic City, New Jersey, U.S.
|align=left|
|-
|Win
|
|align=left| Steve Pannell
|TKO
|1
|08/04/1993
|align=left| Atlantic City, New Jersey, U.S.
|align=left|
|-
|Win
|
|align=left| Kevin Watts
|TKO
|4
|26/02/1993
|align=left| Hauppauge, New York, U.S.
|align=left|
|-
|Win
|
|align=left| John Spiros
|TKO
|4
|30/01/1993
|align=left| New York City, New York, U.S.
|align=left|
|-
|Win
|
|align=left| Roosevelt Williams
|TKO
|7
|04/12/1992
|align=left| Bushkill, Pennsylvania, U.S.
|align=left|
|-
|Win
|
|align=left| Hector Rosario
|PTS
|10
|23/10/1992
|align=left| Bushkill, Pennsylvania, U.S.
|align=left|
|-
|Win
|
|align=left| Jamal Arbubakar
|DQ
|2
|18/09/1992
|align=left| Bushkill, Pennsylvania, U.S.
|align=left|
|-
|Win
|
|align=left| Art Bayliss
|UD
|8
|31/07/1992
|align=left| Bushkill, Pennsylvania, U.S.
|align=left|
|-
|Win
|
|align=left| Keith Providence
|TKO
|3
|28/05/1992
|align=left| Monticello, New York, U.S.
|align=left|
|-
|Win
|
|align=left| Dale Jackson
|PTS
|8
|08/05/1992
|align=left| Allentown, Pennsylvania, U.S.
|align=left|
|-
|Win
|
|align=left| John Spiros
|SD
|4
|10/04/1992
|align=left| New York City, New York, U.S.
|align=left|
|-
|Win
|
|align=left|Julio Hernandez
|TKO
|3
|23/03/1992
|align=left| Harrah's Atlantic City, Atlantic City, New Jersey, U.S.
|align=left|
|-
|Win
|
|align=left| Exum Speight
|UD
|4
|06/03/1992
|align=left| Callicoon, New York, U.S.
|align=left|
|-
|Win
|
|align=left| Tim Wilson
|UD
|4
|16/01/1992
|align=left| Elizabeth, New Jersey, U.S.
|align=left|
|-
|Win
|
|align=left| David Telesco
|PTS
|6
|26/11/1991
|align=left| Westchester County Center, White Plains, New York, U.S.
|align=left|
|-
|Win
|
|align=left| Rick Beechum
|TKO
|2
|24/08/1991
|align=left| Shawnee State University, Portsmouth, Ohio, U.S.
|align=left|
|-
|align=center style="background:#abcdef;"|Draw
|
|align=left| Tim Wilson
|PTS
|4
|17/05/1991
|align=left| New York City, New York, U.S.
|align=left|
|-
|Win
|
|align=left| David Telesco
|PTS
|4
|22/03/1991
|align=left| Callicoon, New York, U.S.
|align=left|

Life after retirement
Mateen worked as a licensed professional boxing trainer in New York and New Jersey, with particular attention to the career of his brother, rising light heavyweight boxer Hamid-Abdul Mateen.

References

External links
 

Boxers from New York City
Cruiserweight boxers
American boxing trainers
1966 births
2012 deaths
People from Bedford–Stuyvesant, Brooklyn
American male boxers
Sportspeople from Brooklyn
Deaths by firearm in New York (state)
Mariticides